A constitutional referendum was held in Burundi on 28 February 2005. The new constitution was approved by 92% of voters.

Proposed constitution
The proposed new constitution guaranteed representation for both Hutu and Tutsi ethnic groups by setting out ethnic quotas for parliament, government and the army, which had been dominated by Tutsis since independence; 
The ethnic composition of the National Assembly would be set at 60% Hutu and 40% Tutsi, with three additional seats reserved for Twas.
In the Senate, seats would be split 50-50 between Hutus and Tutsis, with three seats reserved for Twas.
Military posts would be shared equally between the two groups.
The President of the Republic is elected by universal direct suffrage for a mandate of five years renewable one time.

Campaign
Most political parties urged a "Yes" vote in the poll, but some Tutsi parties urged a "No" vote, stating that the new constitution doesn't give Tutsis enough guarantees.

Results

References

External links
 Burundi's Constitution of 2005

2005
2005 in Burundi
2005 referendums
Constitutional referendums